HMS Springer was an S-class submarine of the Royal Navy, and part of the Third Group built of that class.  She was built by Cammell Laird and launched on 14 May 1945.  So far she has been the only boat of the Royal Navy to bear the name Springer.

History
Built as the Second World War was drawing to a close, she did not see much action.  In 1953 she took part in the Fleet Review to celebrate the Coronation of Queen Elizabeth II.

Springer was sold to the Israeli Navy in 1958 and renamed Tanin (Crocodile or Tannin). Tanin participated in the Six-Day War, launching naval commandos to attack the port of Alexandria. She then tried to torpedo an Egyptian sloop but was severely damaged by a depth charge counter attack. Her commander was awarded the Medal of Courage for his actions at the port of Alexandria. She received spare parts from her sister ship Rahav, formerly HMS Sanguine, when Rahav was retired in 1968. Tanin was listed for disposal in 1972.

A Gal-class submarine named Tanin served the Israeli Navy from 1977 to 2002, and the Dolphin-class submarine  was delivered in May 2012.

References

External links
 

 

British S-class submarines (1931)
Ships built on the River Mersey
1945 ships
Royal Navy ship names
British S-class submarines (1931) of the Israeli Navy